Lucky Mutale (born February 17, 1955) is a retired Zambian boxer. The 5 ft 3.5 in (162 cm) 106 lb (48 kg) Mutale competed in the Men's Bantamweight category for Zambia at the 1980 Summer Olympics. He won a gold medal at the All-Africa Games in 1978 in the Men's Flyweight division.

1980 Olympic results
Below are the results of Lucky Mutale, a flyweight boxer from Zambia who competed at the 1980 Moscow Olympics:

 Round of 64: defeated Moussa Sangare (Mali) on points, 5-0
 Round of 32: lost to Dumitru Cipere (Romania) on points, 0-5

References
Sports Reference

1955 births
Living people
Flyweight boxers
Bantamweight boxers
Boxers at the 1978 Commonwealth Games
Commonwealth Games competitors for Zambia
Boxers at the 1980 Summer Olympics
Olympic boxers of Zambia
Zambian male boxers
African Games gold medalists for Zambia
African Games medalists in boxing
Competitors at the 1978 All-Africa Games